The Junagadh rock inscription of Rudradaman, also known as the Girnar Rock inscription of Rudradaman, is a Sanskrit prose inscribed on a rock by the Western Satraps ruler Rudradaman I. It is located near Girnar hill near Junagadh, Gujarat, India. The inscription is dated to shortly after 150 CE. The Junagadh rock contains inscriptions of Ashoka (one of fourteen of the Major Rock Edicts of Ashoka), Rudradaman I and Skandagupta.

Description
The inscription is found on a major rock to the east of the town of Junagadh in Kathiavad region of Gujarat, India. It is near the base of the Girnar mountain. The Rudradaman inscription is one of the three significant inscriptions found on the rock, dated to be the second in chronology. The oldest inscription is a version of Ashoka edicts, while the last and third inscription is of Skandagupta. The Rudradaman inscription is near the top, above the Ashoka edict. It is dated to shortly after 150 CE.

The inscription has twenty lines, of different lengths spread over about 5.5 feet high and 11 feet wide. The first sixteen lines are extensively damaged in parts and are incomplete, with evidence suggesting willful damage as well as natural rock peeling. The lost text constitutes about 15 percent of the total text. The last four are complete and in a good state of preservation. According to Kielhorn, the alphabet is an earlier form of the "decidedly southern alphabet" of those found later in Gupta Empire and inscriptions of Skandagupta. The inscribed characters are about 7/8 inches in height. The first eight lines offer a historical record of water management and irrigation conduits at the Sudarshana Lake from the era of Chandragupta Maurya (321-297 BCE) to the time when the inscription was written around 150 CE. The last twelve lines praise king Rudradaman I (literally, "garland of Rudra").

The inscription is in Sanskrit language and entirely in prose. The text is generally in good standard classical Sanskrit but reflects much that is non-standard Sanskrit, according to Kielhorn. For example, it disregards the sandhi rules of the Sanskrit language "no less than 10 times", but some of these may have been "mere clerical errors". The text also has an "extreme dearth of verbal forms", states Kielhorn, a form that mirrors the classical prose writing style of the early era. According to Salomon, noting Kielhorn and Renou's observations, "the language of the Junagadh inscription is not pure classical Sanskrit in the strictest sense of the term" and its orthography too is inconsistent about anusvara, visarga, notation of double consonants and the ḷ retroflex. These and other errors may reflect an influence of the less formal epic-vernacular style and the local dialect features, states Salomon. Nevertheless, beyond disregarding some of "the grammatical niceties of Paninian/classical Sanskrit", the inscription does closely approach the classical Sanskrit norms.

Inscription
James Prinsep, known for his work with the Brahmi script, first edited and translated this inscription in April 1838. It thereafter attracted a series of visits, revisions and scholarly publications, including those by Lassen, Wilson, Fleet and the significant work of Bhagvanlal Indraji and Bhau Daji in 1862. The edition and interpretation published by Bhau Daji was reviewed and revised further by Eggeling with collotype estampages by Burgess. Kielhorn's translation was published in the Epigraphia Indica Volume VIII, and the translation below is based on it.

Translation

Significance
The inscription is significant as a historical record of public works in ancient India, nearly 500 years before the inscription was created. It mentions the construction of a water reservoir named Sudarshana nearby, during the reign of the Maurya Empire founder Chandragupta Maurya by Vaishya Pushyagupta. Later, during the reign of Ashoka, it mentions a Yavana king named Tushaspha building conduits. According to 
Dilip Chakrabarti, a professor of South Asian archaeology at the Cambridge University, the inscription is an evidence of historical record keeping tradition in ancient India because Rudradaman otherwise would not have known the names of people involved in the project in 4th-century BCE, or who later worked on the water reservoir in following centuries, before Rudradaman promoted his Sanskrit inscription in 150 CE.

The Junagadh rock inscription also highlights an eulogy-style Sanskrit from the 2nd-century. It is the first long inscription in fairly standard Sanskrit that has survived into the modern era. According to Salomon, the inscription "represents a turning point in the history of epigraphic Sanskrit. This is the first long inscription recorded entirely in more or less standard Sanskrit, as well as the first extensive record in the poetic style. Although further specimens of such poetic prasastis in Sanskrit are not found until the Gupta era, from a stylistic point of view Rudradaman's inscription is clearly their prototype". The Western Satraps successors of Rudradaman, however, were not influenced by this inscription's literary style, but preferred a less formal hybrid Sanskrit language.

The inscription also is significant in recording that the modern era town of Junagadh has ancient roots and it was known as Girinagara in the 2nd-century CE. The mountain Girnar used to be called Urjayat then.

Gallery

See also
Hathibada Ghosundi Inscriptions
Nanaghat inscription
Vasu Doorjamb Inscription

References

2nd-century inscriptions
Sanskrit inscriptions in India
Junagadh
Tourist attractions in Junagadh district